Etho Seithai Ennai is a 2012 Indian Tamil-language romantic action film written and directed by debutante J.Elvin Bosser, starring Shakthi, Liyasree and Anand in lead and Anand Babu, Ilavarasu, John Vijay and Srinath in supporting roles. It released on 17 August 2012 and received negative reviews. The film became a disaster.

Plot
Arjun (Shakthi) falls in love with his classmate Shalini (Liyasree), who hails from a rich family. Shalini has a special bonding with her uncle Nambi (Anand), a local don/businessman. Shalini prefers to marry someone whom her uncle chooses and maintains distance with Arjun. However, beyond a point, Shalini falls for Arjun, impressed by his true love. Nambi spots Shalini and Arjun together and gets furious, but Shalini convinces Nambi and he accepts their love. Suddenly, Arjun goes missing, and it is revealed that Arjun is kidnapped by Veeru (Anand Babu), who happens to be Nambi's business rival as a means of revenging Nambi. Veeru contacts Nambi and threatens to kill Arjun, else Nambi should hand over some of the key business contracts to him. Nambi agrees to Veeru's orders as he wants Arjun to be safe. However, Nambi's true image is revealed and he does not like the love affair of Arjun and Shalini. Nambi feels happy that Veeru has kidnapped Arjun and kill him if Nambi does not turn up with documents, so that Shalini will believe that Veeru has killed Arjun thereby maintaining Nambi's good image in front of Shalini. But Arjun fights Veeru's goons and escapes from there and comes to meet Nambi thereby informing Shalini about Nambi's true image. Arjun and Shalini get married.

Cast

 Shakthi as Arjun
 Liyasree as Shalini
 Anand as Nambi
 Anand Babu as Veeru
 Ilavarasu as Veeru's aide
 Srinath
 John Vijay as Kumar
 Devi Priya as Kumar's wife
 Bhanu Chander as Arjun's father
 Meera Krishnan as Arjun's mother
 Sai Prashanth as Seenu
 Mahanadhi Shankar

Soundtrack
The soundtrack was composed by Ganesh B. Kumar and written by Divakar, Mugil & Georgina
"Fallen In Love" - Singer(s): Tara Kumaravelu
"Kadhil Mattum Inbamaa" - Singer(s): Krish, Shekinah Shawn
"Muzhu Nilavu Ondru" - Singer(s): Abilash
"Oh My Love" - Singer(s): Shalini Singh, Santhosh
"Pogamal Orunalum" - Singer(s): Vijay Narain, Shruthi, Smruthi, Shrik

References

External links
 

2012 romance films
2012 films
2010s Tamil-language films
Indian romance films